is a former Japanese football player.

Playing career
Ishitani was born in Kagoshima Prefecture on July 6, 1979. After graduating from high school, he joined the J2 League club Sagan Tosu in 2000. Although he played several matches as forward during the first season, he did not play as much in 2001. In 2002, he moved to the Japan Football League club Alouette Kumamoto. He retired at the end of the 2002 season.

Club statistics

References

External links

1979 births
Living people
Association football people from Kagoshima Prefecture
Japanese footballers
J2 League players
Japan Football League players
Sagan Tosu players
Roasso Kumamoto players
Association football forwards